The National Typographical Association was an early British trade union, operating on a national basis.

The union was founded in 1830 as the Northern Typographical Union, a federation of small, local societies in England and the Isle of Man, including the well-established Manchester Typographical Society.  Led by John Backhouse, the Association aimed to co-ordinate the activities of its member organisations.  By 1840, the union had 44 member societies, representing more than 1,000 members.

During the early 1840s, the union began organising typographers in southern towns, but suffered setbacks due to a recession.  As a result, it reconstituted itself as the "National Typographical Association" in 1844.  By 1846, the organisation had 74 branches and 5,418 members.  The London Union of Compositors had reconstituted itself as the South East Region, and the General Typographical Association of Scotland as the Northern Region.  However, the organisation had insufficient income to cover disputes, and following a major strike in Edinburgh during 1848, it was forced to dissolve.

The Association's South East Region re-established itself as the London Society of Compositors, while several societies in the north of England formed the Provincial Typographical Association.  It was not until 1853 that the surviving Scottish societies formed the Scottish Typographical Association.

References
Arthur Marsh, Victoria Ryan and John B. Smethurst, Historical Directory of Trade Unions

Defunct trade unions of the United Kingdom
Typesetters
1830 establishments in the United Kingdom
1848 disestablishments in the United Kingdom
Printing trade unions
Organizations established in 1830
Organizations disestablished in 1848
Trade unions established in the 1830s
Trade unions disestablished in the 1840s
London Society of Compositors